Sergei Duvanov (born 1953) is a prominent Kazakhstani journalist who, in 2002, wrote articles that claimed President Nursultan Nazarbayev and several other Kazakh politicians had illicit Swiss bank accounts containing millions of U.S.' dollars. The scandal was labeled "Kazakhgate".

Controversy
In 2001, the U.S. Department of Justice investigated Kazakhgate. Duvanov was arrested in October 2002 at his datcha outside Almaty and accused of raping a 14-year-old girl. The arrest occurred one day before he was going to visit the United States to speak about Kazakhstan's human rights situation. In January, 2003 he was found guilty and sentenced to three and a half years in prison. Among others, the International League for Human Rights (ILHR), a New York-based human right watchdog, condemned the Kazakhstani government's persecution of Sergei Duvanov. On the initiative of its Central Asia Project Manager Peter Zalmayev, ILHR awarded Duvanov (in absentia) its annual human rights award at a ceremony held at the United Nations on December 9, 2002. As of 15 January 2004, he is under a prison regime which allows him to go to work and live at home. However, Duvanov is not allowed to go to public places (a notion undetermined by Kazakh law). Duvanov, and the opposition, claim that the case was politically motivated. On January 15, 2004, Duvanov was released on probation.

See also
Human rights in Kazakhstan

References

1953 births
Living people
Kazakhstani journalists
Kazakhstani prisoners and detainees
Prisoners and detainees of Kazakhstan